Druk Nyamrup Tshogpa (Wylie: ’brug nyam-rub tshogs-pa), formerly the Social Democratic Party, is one of the five registered political parties in Bhutan. It was registered on 20 January 2013. The DNT has been Bhutan's governing party since the 2018 National Assembly election, in which the party won a majority of the seats.

Electoral performance
Druk Nyamrup Tshogpa contested the National Assembly elections of 2013 and 2018.

2013 National Assembly election

In the primary round of the 2nd National Assembly elections held in 2013, the DNT had 35,962 votes and came third place, and so could not take part in the final round.  However the then party president, Aum Dorji Choden, who placed first in her constituency, as well as several other DNT candidates who placed second in their own constituencies, resigned from the party to become successful candidates for the People's Democratic Party in the final round.

2018 National Assembly election

In the 2018 elections, the party won 30 seats with 54.95% of the votes.

References

External links
 
 Official website (archived)

Political parties in Bhutan
Political parties established in 2013
Social democratic parties in Asia